Island Grove Park is a municipal park of the town of Abington, Massachusetts.  It consists of a  parcel of land whose principal feature is a peninsula jutting into Island Grove Pond, a  body of water which was created by impounding the Shumatuscacant River in c. 1700.  The area has a significant history, first as an industrial site, then as an amusement park, before it became the wooded park it is now.  The park was listed on the National Register of Historic Places in 2002 as the Island Grove Park National Register District.

See also
National Register of Historic Places listings in Plymouth County, Massachusetts

References

Historic districts in Plymouth County, Massachusetts
National Register of Historic Places in Plymouth County, Massachusetts
Abington, Massachusetts
Parks in Massachusetts
Historic districts on the National Register of Historic Places in Massachusetts